Lee Dixon (January 22, 1910 – January 8, 1953) was a tap dancer, singer, musician and actor in the 1930s and 1940s. He appeared in Hollywood musicals and other films as well as on the Broadway stage.

Career
Dixon is best remembered for creating the role of Will Parker in the original Broadway production of the Rodgers & Hammerstein musical Oklahoma!  In the summer of 1942, Dixon created the role of the Scarecrow, at The Municipal Opera Association of St. Louis, in the first stage production of The Wizard of Oz to use the songs from the 1939 MGM film. Evelyn Wyckoff played Dorothy Gale, Donald Burr played the Tin Man, Edmund Dorsey played the Cowardly Lion, Helen Raymond played the Wicked Witch of the West, Patricia Bowman played the Sorceress of the North, aka Glinda, and John Cherry played the Wizard of Oz.

Death
Dixon died of alcoholism on January 8, 1953, in New York City, fourteen days before his forty-third birthday.

Filmography
 A Modern Cinderella (1932, short) as Male Dancer, uncredited
 Gold Diggers of 1937 (1936) as Boop Oglethorpe
 Ready, Willing and Able (1937) as Pinky Blair
 The Singing Marine (1937) as Slim Baxter
 Varsity Show (1937) as Johnny 'Rubberlegs' Stevens
 Billy Rose's Casa Mañana Revue (1938, short) as Dixon
 Double or Nothing (1940, short) as Bill
 Double Rhythm (a.k.a. Musical Parade: Double Rhythm) (1946, short) as Happy
 Angel and the Badman (a.k.a. The Angel and the Outlaw) (1947) as Randy McCall, final film role

Broadway
 Oklahoma! (1943-1948)
 Higher and Higher (1940)

References

External links
 
 

1910 births
1953 deaths
American male film actors
American male stage actors
20th-century American male actors